Big Island is an island in Prince Edward County, Ontario, Canada. The island is within the former Township of Sophiasburgh and is the largest of all off-shore islands in Prince Edward County.

References 
 

Islands of Lake Ontario in Ontario